Kemi railway station is located in the town of Kemi in the Lapland Province of Finland. It is operated by VR. The distance to the Helsinki Central railway station, via Haapamäki and Oulu stations is 858.3 kilometres.

The station lies between the Kemi centre and Finnish national road 4, near the town centre services. All passenger trains stop at the station, and the station has a ticket office, a waiting room and a Junamaatti ticket vending machine. Kemi also has a lot of cargo traffic.

Kemi no longer has train traffic operators, instead the traffic is controlled remotely from Oulu. Track switching in cargo traffic requires a lot of trackyard personnel.

Although the tracks to Rovaniemi and to Kolari via Tornio actually separate at the Laurila cargo station north of Kemi, Kemi is an important junction for train traffic. From the Lautiosaari switch north of Kemi, there is also a side track to the Elijärvi mine.

Trackyards
The Kemi station has a large trackyard, divided into personnel train tracks and a cargo trackyard. The trackyard was completely renovated and electrified from 2001 to 2003.

The station also has a side track to the Port of Kemi in the district of Ajos. On this side track are the trackyards of Veitsiluoto, Rivi and Ajos.

External links
 Railway stations of VR
 A picture of the Kemi railway station

Railway station
Railway stations in Lapland (Finland)